is a private university in Hiroo, Shibuya, Tokyo, Japan with an auxiliary suburban campus in Musashino, Tokyo.

History 
Nursing education was started at the Japanese Red Cross Hospital in 1890. And The Japanese Red Cross Junior College for Women was established in 1954.

Undergraduate Schools 
 Faculty of Nursing (With the start of a four-year curriculum in 1986)

Graduate Schools 
 Master's Program in Nursing (Master's program was started in 1993)
 Doctoral Program (The Doctor's program was started in 1995)

Affiliates of the University 
 Japanese Red Cross Hokkaido College of Nursing
 Japanese Red Cross Toyota College of Nursing
 The Japanese Red Cross Hiroshima College of Nursing
 The Japanese Red Cross Kyushu International College of Nursing

External links 
  

Private universities and colleges in Japan
Universities and colleges in Tokyo
Nursing schools in Japan
1890 establishments in Japan
Educational institutions established in 1890
Musashino, Tokyo
Shibuya